Thomas Ross Keene (born December 9, 1952) is an American journalist and Chartered Financial Analyst. He is a host of Bloomberg Surveillance on Bloomberg Radio, Bloomberg Television and Bloomberg Podcasts.

Background
Keene was raised in Rochester, New York. He graduated from the Rochester Institute of Technology and was also enrolled in the external program at The London School of Economics and Political Science. In 1992 he released a folk album called Searching for Ward and June. Keene is a Chartered Financial Analyst and member of the CFA Institute, the National Association of Business Economics, and the Economic Club of New York.  Keene is the author of Flying on One Engine: The Bloomberg Book of Master Market Economists.

Bloomberg career
During his time at Bloomberg LP, Keene helped to create Bloomberg Surveillance, a radio broadcast in which he and his co-hosts (formerly Ken Prewitt, Michael McKee, David Gura, now Jonathan Ferro) conduct interviews and provide analysis of current financial news and economic trends. The broadcast is heard in New York City on WBBR 1130, Boston WXKS 106.1FM/1330AM, San Francisco KNEW 960, Washington WDCH-FM 99.1 and across North America on Sirius XM Radio satellite channel 119. In 2010, Keene began anchoring the television program Surveillance Midday, covering daily business news from Wall Street and since June 2012, the television program Bloomberg Surveillance with Francine Lacqua, weekday mornings on Bloomberg Television.

Keene wrote a weekly interview column and blog, EconoChat, for Bloomberg Businessweek and the Chart of the Day article, available through the Bloomberg Professional services.

References

Living people
1952 births
American editors
Rochester Institute of Technology alumni
Bloomberg L.P. people
American talk radio hosts
American television talk show hosts
American economics writers
American business and financial journalists
American male journalists
CFA charterholders